The 2012–13 Yale Bulldogs men's basketball team represented Yale University during the 2012–13 NCAA Division I men's basketball season. The Bulldogs, led by 14th year head coach James Jones, played their home games at John J. Lee Amphitheater of the Payne Whitney Gymnasium and were members of the Ivy League. They finished the season 14–17, 8–6 in Ivy League play to finish in third place.

Roster

Schedule

|-
!colspan=9| Regular Season

References

Yale Bulldogs men's basketball seasons
Yale
Yale Bulldogs
Yale Bulldogs